Bruce Avery Van Voorhis  (January 29, 1908 – July 6, 1943) was a United States Navy aviator who was shot down in the Pacific theater during World War II.  For his action on July 6, 1943, he was posthumously awarded the Medal of Honor.

Biography
Van Voorhis was born on January 29, 1908, in Aberdeen, Washington, and grew up in Nevada.  He was appointed to the United States Naval Academy in June 1925.

Following graduation from the Academy on June 6, 1929, Ensign Van Voorhis reported for duty aboard the battleship .  That assignment lasted until November 1930 when he transferred to the Naval Air Station in Pensacola, Florida, for aviation training.

From July 1935 until May 1937, he served in the Panama Canal Zone and flew patrols from Coco Solo with Patrol Squadron 2F (VP-2F). In June 1940, Van Voorhis joined the aviation unit assigned to the light cruiser  where he served for a year. In July 1941, he reported for duty at the Naval Air Station, Anacostia, where he served until November 1942.

In December 1942, Van Voorhis, a Lieutenant Commander since July, assumed command of VP-14, but soon thereafter took command of VB-102.  While serving in that capacity, LCDR Van Voorhis was killed near Hare Island of the Kapingamarangi Atoll, the southernmost of the Eastern Caroline Islands.  After a 700-mile flight alone, LCDR Van Voorhis launched successive bombing and strafing attacks on the enemy ground installations.  During his attack, he succeeded in destroying a radio station, anti-aircraft emplacements, and at least one airborne fighter as well as three others on the water.  However, the strength of Japanese aerial opposition eventually forced Van Voorhis lower and lower until the anti-aircraft barrage, the fighters, or perhaps his own bomb blasts, caused the aircraft to crash.  He was posthumously promoted to Commander and awarded the Medal of Honor.

Van Voorhis is buried in the Jefferson Barracks National Cemetery in St. Louis County, Missouri.  He has a headstone at Arlington National Cemetery which reads "In Memory of Bruce Van Voorhis".

Medal of Honor citation

Namesakes and honors
The U.S. Navy   was named in honor of LCDR Van Voorhis.  The Van Voorhis was commissioned on April 22, 1957; she was decommissioned on July 1, 1972.

The airfield at Naval Air Station Fallon is also named in his honor.

There is also a United States Naval Sea Cadet Corps unit under his name the Van Voorhis squadron in Las Vegas, Nevada.

See also

 Daniel Van Voorhis
 List of Medal of Honor recipients

Notes

References

 
 
 

1908 births
1943 deaths
American people of Dutch descent
United States Naval Aviators
United States Navy Medal of Honor recipients
United States Naval Academy alumni
United States Navy officers
United States Navy personnel killed in World War II
World War II recipients of the Medal of Honor